Corneilla-de-Conflent (Corneilla of Conflent) is a commune in the Pyrénées-Orientales department in southern France.

Geography

Localisation 
Corneilla-de-Conflent is located in the canton of Le Canigou and in the arrondissement of Prades.

Population

Sites of interest 
It is home to the church of Saint Mary, an 11th-12th century Romanesque building.

See also
Communes of the Pyrénées-Orientales department

References

Communes of Pyrénées-Orientales